Kim Han-gil (born 21 June 1995) is a South Korean footballer who plays as a midfielder for Gimcheon Sangmu.

Club career

FC Seoul 
Kim Han-gil made his debut in the K League 1, against Suwon Samsung Bluewings on March 5, 2017.

References

External links 
 

1995 births
Living people
Association football midfielders
South Korean footballers
FC Seoul players
K League 1 players
South Korea under-20 international footballers
South Korea under-23 international footballers
Sportspeople from Incheon